These are the orders of battle of the Iraqi and Iranian armies for the start of the Iran–Iraq War in 1980. The data is drawn from the Air Combat Information Group's Arabian Peninsula and Persian Gulf Database.

Iraq

Iraqi Armed Forces

Iraqi Army 

1st Corps (Iraq), sector between Rawanduz and Marivan:
7th Infantry Division (HQ Sulaimaniyah, Iraq)
11th Infantry Division (HQ Sulaimaniyah, Iraq) (-) (113th Infantry Brigade)

Malovany (map p112) shows the 11th Infantry Division with elements north of the Rawanduz - Rayat road; the 7th Infantry Division advancing from its bases at Sulaimaniyah towards the border between Penjwin and Sayid Sadiq; and corps headquarters at Kirkuk.

2nd Army Corps (sector between Qasre-e-Shirin, Ilam, and Mehran, armor deployed between Mehran and Dezful)
1st Hammurabi Armoured Division (Baghdad, Iraq)
6th Armored Division (HQ Baqubah, Iraq) 300 (T-62) (BMP-1)
9th Armored Division (HQ Samavah, Iraq) 300 (T-62 and BMP-1)
?10th Armored Division (HQ Baghdad, Iraq) 300 (T-62) (BMP-1); Malovany shows the division between Baqubah and Tursaq, but notes it was moving to North Khuzestan.
2nd Infantry Division (HQ Kirkuk, Iraq)(Malovany map p112 shows the division deployed west of Badra, far to the south of Kirkuk.
4th Infantry Division (HQ Mosul, Iraq)(Malovany map p112 shows the division about half way between Baqubah and Mandali, south of the road between the two towns.)
6th Infantry Division (HQ Baqubah, Iraq)
8th Infantry Division (HQ Erbil, Iraq)
 
3rd Army Corps (HQ Qurnah, Iraq) (Sector between Dezful and Abadan)
3rd Armored Division (HQ Tikrit, Iraq) 300 (T-62) (BMP-1)(Malovany: east of Basra)
?10th Armored Division (HQ Baghdad, Iraq) 300 (T-62) (BMP-1)
12th Armored Division (HQ Dohuk, Iraq) (Held in Reserve) 300 (T-62) (BMP-1)
1st Mechanized Division (HQ Divaniyah, Iraq) 200 (T-55) (Czech OT-64 APC/BTR-50 APC)
5th Mechanized Division (HQ Basrah, Iraq) 200 (T-55) (Czech OT-64 APC/BTR-50 APC)(Malovany: east of Basra)
31st Independent Special Forces Brigade (-) (2 battalions) (one was attached to 5th MD, another to 3rd AD), 
33rd Independent Special Forces Brigade
10th Independent Armored Brigade (T-72) (BMP-1)
12th Independent Armored Brigade (T-62) (BMP-1)
113th Infantry Brigade (Detachments) (From 11th Infantry Division)

Other forces 
Sudan sent seven infantry brigades (53,000 men) to help Iraq against Iran. In addition, 20,000 Arab volunteers fought in the Iraqi army from five different countries, such as Egypt, Jordan, Morocco, North Yemen and Tunisia.

Iran

Iranian Armed Forces

Iranian Army

Units Garrisoned along the Iraqi Border 

16th Armored Division (Ghazvin, Iran) (M60A1, Chieftain Mk3/5, M113)
81st Armored Division (Kermanshah, Iran) (M60A1) (M113)
92nd Armored Division (Khuzestan, Iran) (M60A1, Chieftain Mk3/5) (M113)
21st Infantry Division (Tehran, Iran)
28th Infantry Division (Sanandaj, Saquez, and Marivan, Iran) (1 Armored Brigade) (M60A1) (M113)
64th Infantry Division (Orumiyeh, Iran)
77th Infantry Division (Khorasan, Iran) (1 Armored Brigade) (M48A5 MBT) (BTR-50)
37th Armored Brigade (Shiraz, Iran) (M4 Sherman, M36 Jackson) (M8 Greyhound)
88th Armored Brigade (Zahedan (M47 MBT) (covering the borders to Afghanistan and Pakistan) 
30th Infantry Brigade (Gorgan, Iran) 
84th Infantry Brigade (Khoramabad, Iran) (Deployed in Field) (Connecting the positions of the 81st and 92nd AD)
23rd Airborne Special Forces Brigade (Tehran, Iran) (Deployed along the Iraqi border in 13 separate Detachments)
55th Airborne Brigade (Shiraz, Iran) (One battalion deployed in Sardasht, and a company each in Sanandaj and Dezful, Iran)
58th Takavar Division (Shahroud)
11th Independent Artillery Group
22nd Independent Artillery Group (Khuzestan, Iran)
33rd Independent Artillery Group
44th Independent Artillery Group
55th Independent Artillery Group (Khuzestan, Iran)
411th Engineering Group of Borujerd

Iranian Navy
Takavar Marine Battalion of Bushehr

Revolutionary Guards (Pasdaran)
Ground Forces of the Islamic Revolutionary Guard Corps
8th Najaf Ashraf Division (Najafabad County, Isfahan)
14th Imam Hossein Division (Isfahan)
17th Ali ibn Abi Taleb Division (Qom)
25th Karbala Division (Mazandaran)
27th Mohammad Rasulullah Division (Tehran)
31st Ashura Division (East Azarbaijan, West Azarbaijan, Ardabil)
33rd Al-Mahdi Brigade (Fars)
41st Tharallah Division (Kerman)
unnamed others

Other forces 
Iran was supported by the Iraqi Shia rebels and Lebanese Hezbollah. Shia volunteer fighters have arrived to help Iran from Afghanistan and Pakistan.

Notes

Sources
Tom Cooper & Farzad Bishop, with additional details from N. R., I Persian Gulf War: Iraqi Invasion of Iran, September 1980, Sep 9, 2003, 06:33, Air Combat Information Group

Further reading 
Pesach Malovany, "Wars of Modern Babylon", University Press of Kentucky, June 2017,  / .
E R Hooton, Tom Cooper, Farzin Nadimi, The Iran-Iraq War Volume 1: The Battle for Khuzestan September 1980-May 1982, Middle East@War #23, October 2019 Revised & Expanded Edition, ISBN 9781913118525. It's precise down the number of heavy vehicles (tanks etc.) per brigade as of September 1980.

Iran–Iraq War
Orders of battle